"Ay Amor" is a Latin pop song by Colombian recording artist Fonseca. It was released as the third radio-single from his fourth studio album Ilusión (2011) on August 31, 2012. On October 9, 2012, the song was released digitally with a dance version produced by Fainal.

Music video 
The music video was first released onto Fonseca's official YouTube channel on September 6, 2012. It was directed by Pablo García, whom had worked in the video of his last single "Eres Mi Sueño", and was co-directed by the same Fonseca. The music video was shot in Miami and features the Colombian actress and model Carolina Gómez, with a black long outfit and a blue wig. As of July 20, 2013 the video has reached 1,82 million views on YouTube.

Track listing

Credits and personnel 
Recording
Recorded at Fun MAchine - Pirate Studios and mixed at PolaPola Studios Brooklyn, New York, USA.

Personnel

Songwriting – Juan Fernando Fonseca
Production – Andres Levin
Vocal engineering and recording – Ray Aldaco
Music recording – Andres Levin and Juan Fernando Fonseca

Assistant vocal recording – Juan Fernando Fonseca
Mixing – Andy Baldwin

Credits adapted from the liner notes of Ilusión, Sony Music Latin, 10 Music.

Charts

References

Fonseca (singer) songs
2012 singles
2011 songs
Spanish-language songs
Sony Music Latin singles
Songs written by Fonseca (singer)